Pâslaru, meaning "felt shoemaker", is a Romanian surname. Notable people with the surname include:

Eugen Pâslaru, Moldovan politician
Margareta Pâslaru, Romanian-American singer and actress
Tereza Pîslaru, Romanian handball player

Romanian-language surnames
Occupational surnames